The 1921–22 Yale Bulldogs men's ice hockey season was the 27th season of play for the program.

Season
After struggling through the previous two seasons, Yale brought in their third coach in as many years. The hiring of Clarence Wanamaker from Dartmouth brought about a resurgence for the program, not least of which because the Bulldogs returned to their expansive schedule that was characteristic of the team before World War I. In another return to form, the New Haven Arena began to host ice hockey games for the first time in years and Yale would finally have a local home after having to play as vagabonds since the start of the war.

Yale played inconsistently throughout the year, playing well in some games and poorly in others. The highlight of the season was winning both games against Princeton, guaranteeing themselves at least a second-place finish in the Triangular League. The experience the players gained from the nineteen games, however, would pay dividends in the coming years.

Roster

Standings

Schedule and Results

|-
!colspan=12 style="color:white; background:#00356B" | Regular Season

References

Yale Bulldogs men's ice hockey seasons
Yale
Yale
Yale
Yale